Alto Township is one of twenty-two townships in Lee County, Illinois, USA.  As of the 2010 census, its population was 565 and it contained 230 housing units.

Geography

Cities, towns, villages
 Steward

Cemeteries
The township contains these two cemeteries: Steward and Union.

Airports and landing strips
 Thompson Landing Strip
 Wilbur Thompson Airport

Demographics

School districts
 Indian Creek Community Unit District 425

Political districts
 Illinois's 14th congressional district
 State House District 90
 State Senate District 45

References
 
 United States Census Bureau 2009 TIGER/Line Shapefiles
 United States National Atlas

External links
 City-Data.com
 Illinois State Archives
 Township Officials of Illinois

Townships in Lee County, Illinois
1860 establishments in Illinois
Populated places established in 1860
Townships in Illinois